Another Beauty is a 1998 memoir by the Polish poet Adam Zagajewski. It focuses on Zagajewski's student years and early time as a poet in Kraków in the 1960s and 1970s, and his involvement with the artist group "Now", leaving aestheticism behind to focus on contemporary politics and clash with communist authorities.

See also
 1998 in literature
 Polish literature

References

1998 non-fiction books
Polish memoirs
Polish books
Books by Adam Zagajewski
Wydawnictwo Literackie books